Ceratocanthus aeneus, known generally as the shining ball scarab beetle or round fungus beetle, is a species of pill scarab beetle in the family Hybosoridae. It is found in North America.

References

Further reading

 

scarabaeiformia
Articles created by Qbugbot
Beetles described in 1819
Beetles of North America